Blizhnemelnichny is a rural locality (a khutor) Nizhnechirskoye Rural Settlement, Surovikinsky District, Volgograd Oblast, Russia. The population was 106 as of 2010.

Geography 
Blizhnemelnichny is located 35 km southeast of Surovikino (the district's administrative centre) by road. Blizhnepodgorsky is the nearest rural locality.

References 

Rural localities in Surovikinsky District